Irve  may refer to:

People
 Irve Libby (born 1950), pardoned convicted criminal, disbarred lawyer, and aide to the President and Vice President of the United States, George W. Bush and Dick Cheney, respectively
 Irve Stauffer, husband of kidnap victim Mary and father kidnap victim of Elizabeth; see biopic Abducted: The Mary Stauffer Story

Other uses
 NASA Inflatable Reentry Vehicle Experiment (IRVE), a series of experimental heatshields
Irbe River

See also